Leucanthemum maximum is a species of flowering plant in the aster family known by the common name max chrysanthemum.

Range
It is native to France and Spain but it can be found growing wild in other parts of the world as an introduced species and sometimes a garden escapee.

Description
It is a rhizomatous perennial herb growing 30 to 70 centimeters tall with many large serrated leaves around the base of the stem on winged petioles. There are smaller lance-shaped leaves alternately arranged along the stem. The inflorescence is generally a large, solitary flower head which may exceed 8 centimeters in diameter. It has a fringe of 20 to 30 white ray florets around a center of many densely packed yellow disc florets. The fruit is a small ribbed achene without a pappus.

Taxonomy
This species is one of the wild chrysanthemums Luther Burbank crossed to produce the popular garden hybrid known as the Shasta daisy, Leucanthemum × superbum.

References

External links
USDA Plants Profile

Photo gallery

maximum
Plants described in 1800